Vachellia nilotica subsp. indica is a perennial tree native to Bangladesh, India, Myanmar, Nepal and Pakistan.  It is also cultivated in Angola, Egypt, Ethiopia, and Tanzania.  Common names for it include babul, kikar and  prickly acacia.

Its uses include chemical products, environmental management, fiber, food and drink, forage, medicine and wood.

Uses

Tannin
The bark of V. nilotica subsp. indica has a tannin content of greater than 20%. The pods without seeds have a tannin content of  about 18–27%.

Chemical compounds
The bark has been found to contain catechin, epicatechin, dicatechin, quercitin, gallic acid and procyanidin.

References

nilotica subsp. indica
Forages
Plant subspecies